Cristiana Brandolini d'Adda, Contessa di Valmareno ( Agnelli; born 16 February 1927), is an Italian socialite and member of the Agnelli family.

Early life and family 
Cristiana Agnelli was born on 16 February 1927 in Turin. Her father was Edoardo Agnelli, an industrialist, and her mother was Donna Virginia Bourbon del Monte, a noblewoman. Her paternal grandfather, Giovanni Agnelli, founded Fiat S.p.A. Her maternal grandfather was Carlo del Monte, Prince of San Faustino. She was the fifth of seven children. Her sisters were Princess Clara von Fürstenberg, Countess Susanna Rattazzi, and Countess Maria Sole. Her brothers were Gianni Agnelli, Giorgio Agnelli, and Umberto Agnelli. Agnelli's father died in a plane crash when she was eight years old and her mother died in a car accident when she was eighteen years old. Her paternal granddaughter is Coco Brandolini d'Adda, whose mother was the ambassador of the Valentino style in the world, her sister had an on-off relationship with Lapo Elkann, and her father descends from Philip IV of France and Maria Theresa of Austria.

Career 
Brandolini d'Adda was photographed by Cecil Beaton in 1951. In 1973, she was added to the International Best Dressed List for "outstanding example of elegance without ostentation", and was elevated to the Best-Dressed Hall of Fame in 1975. She has been noted for her style and taste in both fashion and decorating.

Personal life 
At the age of nineteen, Agnelli moved to Rome with her sister Susanna to study art. She met Brandolino Brandolini d'Adda, Count of Valmareno, who was nicknamed Brando, at a party in Cortina d'Ampezzo, where she was visiting her sister Clara. In 1947, they were married in a Catholic ceremony at the Basilica of St. Bartholomew on the Island, Tiber Island, in Rome. Upon marriage, Agnelli became Countess Brandolini d'Adda of Valmareno. They had four sons: Tiberto, who was nicknamed Ruy, Leonello, Nuno, and Brandino. Tiberto would go on to marry Princess Georgina de Faucigny-Lucinge et Coligny, Nuno married Muriel Phan van Thiet, and Brandino married Marie Angliviel de la Beaumelle. The couple owned homes in Venice, Paris, and Geneva but mainly spent time at their country estate Vistorta. Brandolini d'Adda's husband died at the age of 85 in 2005.

References 

1927 births
Agnelli family
Cristiana
Bourbon del Monte family
Italian countesses
Italian socialites
Living people
People from Turin